Nimetullah Erdoğmuş (born 1960), is a Turkish politician and theologian, who is currently Deputy Speaker of the Grand National Assembly of Turkey since 23 February 2020.

Early life and career
Erdoğmuş was born on 1960 in Bingöl. He graduated from the Atatürk University as a theology. He received special training in the field of professional knowledge in Egypt. He worked as a provincial mufti in Diyarbakır, Elazığ and Kilis.

Personal life
He is married with five children and can speak Arabic.

References 

1960 births
Deputies of Diyarbakır
Deputies of Şanlıurfa
Kurdish politicians
Turkish Kurdish politicians
Living people
People from Bingöl
Peoples' Democratic Party (Turkey) politicians
Members of the 25th Parliament of Turkey
Members of the 26th Parliament of Turkey
Deputy Speakers of the Grand National Assembly of Turkey
21st-century Turkish politicians
Members of the 27th Parliament of Turkey